The Moog Sonic Six is a duophonic analog synthesizer that was manufactured by Moog Music from 1972 to 1979. Because of its portable design and built-in speaker, the Sonic Six was widely used for lectures and educational purposes, often by Bob Moog himself.

Musonics Origins
The Sonic Six is the result of Bill Waytena, then the owner of synthesizer manufacturer Musonics, acquiring R.A. Moog Inc. Interested in the marketing opportunity afforded by the Moog name, Waytena acquired R.A. Moog Inc., moved the company to Buffalo, New York, and renamed it Moog/Musonics (which eventually was shortened to simply Moog Music). It was under this new brand that a new version of the Musonics Sonic V was released as the Moog Music Sonic Six.

Design
The Sonic Six is mounted in its own briefcase; the upper control panel folds and latches over the keyboard to ease transportation and storage.  This feature was used by a number of synthesizer manufacturers of the time, however the Sonic Six was Moog Music's only product that incorporated this into its design.  The Sonic Six is also the only Moog synthesizer that featured a built-in speaker rather than requiring the user to use an external amplifier.  Unlike the MiniMoog  there is no modulation wheel, and the pitch bend wheel has a design unique among Moog units.  It is spring-loaded, so it returns to center automatically, and is mounted horizontally, like some Moog ribbon controllers. 

The Sonic Six features two VCOs with changeable waveform (sawtooth, triangle, square, pulse), one low-pass VCF, a VCA, two multimode LFOs for modulation and a 49-note keyboard.

The Sonic Six is a two-oscillator duophonic synth. It can be set for duophonic, (two notes at a time... one oscillator takes high-note priority and one oscillator takes low note priority), monophonic (both oscs), or monophonic with a drone (one osc changes pitch, one does not). Available waveshapes are pulse (variable), saw, and triangle. The pitch of each oscillator can be controlled by dual LFO, one by contour, and the other by the other oscillator.  One can adjust the temperament of the Sonic Six to play scales that have less than 12 notes per octave. The Sonic Six also features pink or white noise.  Although the oscillators are temperature-compensated, their pitch tends to drift, as on many analog synths.

The Dual LFO design is unique.  A mix control allows mixing of each LFO source, while voltage control of each LFO allows additional rate control not often seen in portable synthesizers. Each LFO can produce saw, reverse saw, triangle, and square wave outputs. The Sonic Six also features a ring modulator which allows a player to produce non-chromatic sounds. Audio signals may also be routed through the Moog filter and ring modulator via an external input. 

The Sonic Six's contour generator is a simple design as compared to other synthesizer models. Attack and release are settable.  Sustain is set by a switch, offering infinite (while a key is held) or zero sustain times.  Only a single contour generator is shared by both the VCA and filter.  The filter is standard -24dB/oct Butterworth filter design featuring filter cutoff, resonance, keyboard control switch, contour amount, and LFO amount. The Sonic Six also features “glissando”, another word for portamento. This can be assigned to both oscillators or just one, depending upon the setting. The Sonic Six also features a built in amplifier and speaker, as well as a standard line level output.

References

External links
 Sonic Six at Synthmuseum.com
 Sonic Six at Vintage Synth Explorer
 Gordon Reid's retro in Sound On Sound magazine (archive.org)
 Website with mp3s done entirely on the Sonic Six
 Sonic Six Test Report - GreatSynthesizers

Sonic 6